Jesús Lucía Trasviña Waldenrath (born 20th-century) is a Mexican politician. She has been a Senator for Baja California Sur from MORENA since 2018.

References 

20th-century births
Living people
20th-century Mexican politicians
20th-century Mexican women politicians
21st-century Mexican politicians
21st-century Mexican women politicians
Senators of the LXIV and LXV Legislatures of Mexico
Members of the Senate of the Republic (Mexico) for Baja California Sur
Morena (political party) politicians
Women members of the Senate of the Republic (Mexico)